Rudolf "Ruedi" Arn (born 1 November 1935) is a Swiss former footballer who played in the late 1950s and early 1960s as midfielder.

Born in Niederbipp, Oberaargau, Arn played at least seven seasons for Luzern and joined FC Basel's first team for their 1964–65 season under player-manager Helmut Benthaus. After playing in three test games Arn played his domestic league debut for his new club in the away game on 23 August 1964 as Basel were defeated 2–3 against Biel-Bienne.

This was the only league match that Arn played for Basel in the Nationalliga A and then it seems that he then ended his active playing career.

References

Sources
 Die ersten 125 Jahre. Publisher: Josef Zindel im Friedrich Reinhardt Verlag, Basel. 
 Verein "Basler Fussballarchiv" Homepage

FC Luzern players
FC Basel players
Swiss men's footballers
Association football midfielders
1935 births
Living people